Dhinakaran or Dinakaran is a given name or surname, which may refer to:

 D. G. S. Dhinakaran, Indian evangelical preacher
T. T. V. Dhinakaran, Indian politician
Dinakaran, Tamil newspaper
Dinakaran attack case, the attack on the newspaper

Hindu given names
Indian masculine given names
Tamil masculine given names